Bertrand Fayolle (born 15 August 1975) is a French former professional footballer who played as a forward.

After football 
After retiring from football, Fayolle became the assistant manager of AS Valence from 2010 to 2012. Later, he went to work for Ford, while living in the region of Valence.

From 2015 to 2016, Fayolle worked as a coach in the U13 team of an amateur club in Saint-Christo-en-Jarez.

Career statistics

Honours 
Saint-Étienne
 French Division 2: 1998–99

Nancy
 Ligue 2: 2004–05

References 

1975 births
Living people
Footballers from Saint-Étienne
French footballers
Association football coaches
Association football forwards
Division d'Honneur players
Ligue 2 players
Ligue 1 players
Swiss Super League players
Championnat National players
AS Saint-Étienne players
FC Sion players
Clermont Foot players
ASOA Valence players
AS Nancy Lorraine players
Amiens SC players
FC Gueugnon players
Olympique de Valence players
French expatriate footballers
Expatriate footballers in Switzerland
French expatriate sportspeople in Switzerland